Loricaria luciae, sometimes known as Lucia's whiptail, is a species of catfish in the family Loricariidae. It is native to South America, where it occurs in the Paraguay River basin (including the Miranda River, the Aquidabán River, the Tebicuary River, the Rio Negro, and the Pantanal) in Argentina, Bolivia, Brazil, and Paraguay, ranging south to the Paraguay's confluence with the Paraná River. It is typically found in habitats with flowing water, ranging in size from arroyos to large rivers, where it generally occurs at a depth of less than 1.5 m (5 ft) in environments with soft substrates. It is sometimes seen in riffles and blackwater areas. The species reaches 18.9 cm (7.4 inches) in standard length and is believed to be a facultative air-breather. Its specific epithet, luciae, honors Lúcia H. Rapp Py-Daniel of the National Institute of Amazonian Research for her contributions to loricariid taxonomy and systematics.

References 

Loricariidae
Fish described in 2013